The 2022 ICF World Junior and U23 Canoe Slalom Championships took place in Ivrea, Italy, from 5 to 10 July 2022, under the auspices of the International Canoe Federation (ICF). It was the 23rd edition of the competition for Juniors (U18) and the 10th edition for the Under 23 category.

Russia and Belarus were excluded from participation due to the 2022 Russian invasion of Ukraine.

Medal summary

Men

Canoe

Junior

U23

Kayak

Junior

U23

Women

Canoe

Junior

U23

Kayak

Junior

U23

Medal table

References

External links
International Canoe Federation

ICF World Junior and U23 Canoe Slalom Championships
World Junior and U23 Canoe Slalom Championships
World Junior and U23 Canoe Slalom Championships
World Junior and U23 Canoe Slalom Championships